Leslie Reid may refer to:
 Leslie Reid (equestrian)
 Leslie Reid (artist)